High School Style Icon is a South Korean survival audition program. It airs on YouTube on Monday, at 20:00 (KST).

Format 
High School Style Icon is a fashion audition program, which is produced by Blank Corporation and broadcast for high school students via YouTube and Naver TV. Season 1, 13 high school students compete in different fashion challenges. and Season 2, 20 high school students.

The program is conducted in a survival way, and the participants who pass the preliminary round are eliminated through various missions, and the final winner is given an annual salary of 100 million won ($90,000 USD), Hyodo Benz, and an opportunity to launch their own brand. In Season 2, the trip to Paris will also be awarded.

Host 
 Kim Hee-chul (Season 1-2)

Judging Panel 
 Park Tae Il (Season 1-2)
 Reddy (Season 1-2)
 Han Hyeyeon (Season 1-2)
 Moon Gabi (Season 1)
 Stephanie Lee (Season 2)
 Eum Hyeokjin (Season 2)

Season 1

Contestants

Mission

Season 2 (Round 2) 
Since the format of Season 2 changed so they showed the 'audition' process of 100 candidates, this list will reflect only the top 20 who made it into the second round.

Contestants

References

External links
 
 
 Official YouTube Channel

Korean-language television shows
2019 South Korean television series debuts